Gardan Partaraj Tang Pivareh (also Romanized as Gardan Partarāj Tang Pīvāreh; also known as Gardanpar-e Soltan) is a village in Ludab Rural District, Ludab District, Boyer-Ahmad County, Kohgiluyeh and Boyer-Ahmad Province, Iran. At the 2006 census, its population was 26, in 4 families.

References 

Populated places in Boyer-Ahmad County